Rahmat Highway is a road in southern Shiraz, Iran. Built in 1998, it is a highway road that runs from Motahari Boulevard east to Modarres Boulevard, where it becomes Sardaran Boulevard.

References

Roads in Iran